Picchio dal Pozzo is the debut album by the Italian progressive rock band Picchio dal Pozzo, released in 1976.

The album was released on vinyl in 1976 by Grog Records, a record label founded by Aldo De Scalzi, the band's leader. It is a work in its own right in the panorama of Italian progressive, similar in some ways to the style of groups of such so-called Canterbury scene bands as Soft Machine and Gong. Dominated by keyboards and horns, accompanying vocals characterized by the surreal lyrics and unusual vocal effects.

The album is dedicated to Robert Wyatt and the opening track "Merta" closely follows the melodic line of Wyatt's "Sea Song" from his 1974 album Rock Bottom.

Track listing

Side A ("Hay Fay")
1. "Merta
2. "Cocomelastico" 
3. "Seppia"
3a. "Sottotitolo"
3b. "Frescofresco"
3c. "Rusf" 
4. "Bofonchia"

Side B ("Fay Hay")
5. "Napier"
6. "La floricultura di Tschincinnata"
7. "La bolla"
8. "Off"

Personnel
 Andrea Beccari — bass, horn, voice
 Aldo De Scalzi —  keyboard, voice
 Paolo Griguolo —  guitar, voice
 Giorgio Karaghiosoff —  percussion

See also
Italian progressive rock
Canterbury scene

Notes

1976 debut albums
Picchio dal Pozzo albums